Nives Ivanković (born 1 June 1967) is a Croatian actress.

Biography
Ivanković was born on 1 June 1967 in Duvno. She attended elementary and secondary school in Split and graduated in acting from the Academy of Performing Arts at the University of Sarajevo. She is a permanent member of the drama theatre in Split, for 19 years. Ivanković is a television, film and theatre actress award winning (awards Marul for role in Mare Libre, the Golden Smile on Dani satire etc.), and for the general public she is known for her roles on the TV series: Nad lipom 35, Lud, zbunjen, normalan, Balkan Inc., Bibin svijet etc.

Personal life 
Nives Ivanković lives and works in Split.

Filmography

References

External links

1967 births
Living people
Croats of Bosnia and Herzegovina
Actors from Split, Croatia
Croatian stage actresses
Croatian television actresses
Croatian film actresses
Golden Arena winners